In Greek mythology, Damasichthon (Ancient Greek: Δαμασίχθων) was a king of Thebes and the son of Opheltes, purported to be son to Peneleos (regent of Thebes).

Mythology 
As Autesion, king of Thebes, left the city in obedience to an oracle, Damasichthon was designated as his successor. Damasichthon was the father of Ptolemy, who took over the government after him.

See also
 Theban cycle

Notes

References
 Pausanias, Description of Greece with an English Translation by W.H.S. Jones, Litt.D., and H.A. Ormerod, M.A., in 4 Volumes. Cambridge, MA, Harvard University Press; London, William Heinemann Ltd. 1918. . Online version at the Perseus Digital Library
Pausanias, Graeciae Descriptio. 3 vols. Leipzig, Teubner. 1903.  Greek text available at the Perseus Digital Library.
Realencyclopädie der Classischen Altertumswissenschaft, Band IV, Halbband 8, Corniscae-Demodoros (1901), s. 2038
Wilhelm Heinrich Roscher (ed.): Ausführliches Lexikon der griechischen und römischen Mythologie. Band 1.1, Leipzig 1886, s. 941

Theban kings
Theban characters in Greek mythology